Kokuryu may refer to:

 Kokuryū A Japanese form of Martial Arts founded in the mid-1970s as a new combination of several existing arts
 Goguryeo - A Korean kingdom
 Kokuryū (S 506) - sixth of Japan's Sōryū-class submarines launched in 2013
 Black Dragon Society "Kokuryukai" - Japanese paramilitary society
 JS Kokuryū (SS-506), a Japanese Sōryū-class submarine